Mark Pearson (born 28 October 1939) is an English former footballer who played in the Football League as an inside forward for Manchester United, Sheffield Wednesday, Fulham and Halifax Town.

Born in Ridgeway, Derbyshire, Pearson joined Manchester United as a trainee in 1955 and signed professional forms two years later. He made his first-team debut as an 18-year-old on 19 February 1958 as part of the makeshift side that beat Sheffield Wednesday in United's first game after the Munich Air Crash. He was involved in two of the three goals, and The Times' correspondent was impressed: Pearson, nicknamed "Pancho" due to the Mexican appearance that his sideburns gave him, played for the club until 1963, making 80 appearances and scoring 14 goals, when he was sold to Sheffield Wednesday for a £17,000 fee. He did not make United's side for the 1963 FA Cup Final, where they defeated Leicester City 3-1 to clinch their first major trophy of the post-Munich era.

Despite his regular action for United in the immediate aftermath of the Munich crash, and the deaths of Tommy Taylor and Liam Whelan, Pearson was soon faced with competition for a regular place in the team when crash survivors Bobby Charlton and Dennis Viollet regained fitness, and gained a fresh rival that summer when United signed Albert Quixall. Over the next few years, competition for places became tighter due to the arrival of new signings David Herd and Denis Law, as well as the form of younger players including Johnny Giles.

 In 1965, after two season at Hillsborough, Pearson joined Fulham and played a pivotal role in the club's escape from relegation in the 1965–66 season. Fulham seemed doomed until a 2–0 win against Liverpool, runaway league leaders and eventual champions, in which Ian St John was sent off for punching Pearson, sparked them into a sequence of 10 wins from their last 13 matches. He left Fulham for Halifax Town in 1968, playing just five league games before retiring the following year at the age of 29.

References

External links
 

1939 births
Living people
People from North East Derbyshire District
Footballers from Derbyshire
English footballers
Association football forwards
Manchester United F.C. players
Sheffield Wednesday F.C. players
Fulham F.C. players
Halifax Town A.F.C. players
Bacup Borough F.C. players
English Football League players